The Lee Hochul Literary Prize for Peace (Korean: 이호철 통일로 문학상) is an international literary award which takes place in South Korea annually in order to recognize the power of literature to promote peace. There are two awards: the main Lee Hochul Literary Prize for Peace, and a Special Award which is given to an young and upcoming Korean writer. The main prize winner receives a monetary sum of 50 million won, while the Special Award winner receives 20 million won.

The Lee Hochul Literary Prize for Peace was established in 2017 by the Eunpyeong-gu District Office of Seoul, South Korea, in honor of the author Lee Ho-cheol. Lee Ho-chul is a symbolic figure whose literary works reflect a deep longing for peace and the reunification of Korean peninsula.

Recipients

The Grand Prize Laureate

The Special Award Laureate

References

External links 
 

International literary awards
South Korean literary awards
Awards established in 2017